Nicola Jane Aiken (née Durbin; born 4 February 1969) is a British Conservative Party politician serving as the Member of Parliament (MP) for Cities of London and Westminster since 2019. She was the leader of Westminster City Council from 2017 to 2020.

Early life 
Born in Cardiff, Aiken is the daughter of John and Pamela Durbin. She was educated at Radyr Comprehensive School, Cardiff and the University of Exeter, from which she graduated with a BA (Honours) in Sociology in 1991.

Career
Aiken first moved to London in 1997. From 2001 to 2009, she was head of public relations at Bradford & Bingley plc.

In 2006, she was elected as a Conservative councillor for Westminster City Council, representing Warwick ward, a safe seat for her party covering an area in Pimlico. She remained a councillor until she stood down at the 2022 election. Aiken held various positions on the Council, including the Cabinet Member for Children’s Services and Public Protection & Licensing and the leader of Council from January 2017 to January 2020.

From 2015 to 2018, Aiken was a board member of the Child and Family Court Advisory and Support Service. She was also a trustee of the board of The Royal Parks (2017–20).

Aiken voted to remain in the European Union in the 2016 referendum. She later supported Prime Minister Boris Johnson's Brexit withdrawal deal in Parliament, and voted in favour of the Internal Market Bill in 2020.

Member of Parliament 
She was selected as the Conservative Party's candidate for the Central London seat of Cities of London and Westminster to fight the 2019 general election. In early December 2019, Aiken left Twitter, calling it "toxic". She has since returned to the social networking site.

At that election, Aiken defeated the Labour Party's Gordon Nardell and Chuka Umunna, the Liberal Democrat candidate who had left the Labour Party in protest against Jeremy Corbyn's leadership. She received 3,953 more votes than her nearest competitor, Umunna. This represented a decrease in the majority held by the constituency's previous MP.

In Parliament, she was a member of the Women and Equalities Committee until September 2020. She was appointed vice chairman of the Conservative Party in October 2020, with responsibility for women. In September 2020, she was appointed Deputy Chairman of the Conservative Party. Aiken also sits on the UK Delegation for the Council of Europe and is a Member of the House of Commons Commission. 

Aiken has pushed for legislation on child safety. She has urged the Tories to increase assistance for private renters. In June 2021 she joined the Monken Hadley Common Bill Unopposed Bill Committee.

Outside of politics, Aiken is a company director at Sprucespace Property Management. She has worked for the Public Relations and Communications Association in media relations and crisis communications.

Personal life 
Aiken has lived in Pimlico for over twenty years, and prior to that, lived in the Barbican. She lists her recreations as "walking".

She married Alexander Stuart Aiken in 2000. Since 2013, he has been executive director of government communications at the Cabinet Office for the UK Government. From 2000 to 2012, he was director of communications and strategy for Westminster City Council, whilst his wife was a councillor there. Before that, he worked for the Conservative Party as head of its campaigns unit and its press office. The couple have a son and daughter.

References

External links

1969 births
Living people
UK MPs 2019–present
Alumni of the University of Exeter
Conservative Party (UK) councillors
Conservative Party (UK) MPs for English constituencies
Councillors in the City of Westminster
21st-century British women politicians
Female members of the Parliament of the United Kingdom for English constituencies
Leaders of local authorities of England
Politicians from Cardiff
21st-century British women
21st-century British people
Women councillors in England